Manda Vijay Mhatre is a member of the 13th Maharashtra Legislative Assembly. She represents the Belapur Assembly Constituency. She belongs to the Bharatiya Janata Party

References

Maharashtra MLAs 2014–2019
Bharatiya Janata Party politicians from Madhya Pradesh
Living people
People from Navi Mumbai
Marathi politicians
21st-century Indian women politicians
21st-century Indian politicians
Year of birth missing (living people)
Bharatiya Janata Party politicians from Maharashtra
Women members of the Maharashtra Legislative Assembly